The Crail Golfing Society is a Scottish golf club  established in February 1786 in the Golf Hotel, Crail, Fife. The society is the seventh oldest golf club in the world. Its oldest course, Balcomie, was formally laid out by Old Tom Morris in 1894, but competitions were played there since the 1850s.

The East Coast of Fife is particularly dense in links courses and is popular for golf tourism. To the south west are the links of Elie, Anstruther, Lundin and Leven. Within an hour to the north are Scotscraig, Carnoustie, Monifieth and Panmure.

Crail Golfing Society owns and operates two courses, Balcomie and Craighead, which differ in character.  Balcomie, designed by Old Tom Morris in 1895, is a traditional links, retaining  original holes, and a diverse and distinctive set of Par 3s.  The 14th is the most photographed hole, a Par 3 with an elevated tee high above the beach dropping down to a heavily bunkered green.  Longer holes, such as the 4th and 5th, feature doglegs around the sea edge. From Balcomie, on the north of the promontory, can be seen the mountain Lochnagar in the Balmoral estate, in addition to the Tay estuary, and much of eastern Scotland.

Craighead, designed by American architect Gil Hanse is longer, a modern links, with rolling greens, native walls and wildlife typical of the Fife coast. The two links are on north and south edges of Fifeness, respectively, and have different views.

See also
 North Carr, a notorious reef extending out from the golf courses, on which many ships were wrecked
 George Learmonth of Balcomie (d. 1585) local landowner

References

External links 
 
Golf History, at Scotland.org - the official online gateway to Scotland
Sport - Golf, at the Gazetteer for Scotland
Scottish Golf History, at www.scottishgolfhistory.org

Golf clubs and courses in Fife
Crail
1786 establishments in Scotland
Sports clubs established in the 1780s